Endings of a New Kind is the debut studio album by the Filipino indie rock band Taken by Cars, released in 2008 on Party Bear Records. Four radio singles have been released from this album including 'A Weeknight Memoir (In High Definition)', 'Uh Oh', 'December 2 Chapter VII', 'Shapeshifter'  and 'Neon Brights'.

Track listing
"Intro" - 0:51
"Uh Oh" - 3:38
"The Blackout" - 3:09
"Colourway" - 4:09
"A Weeknight Memoir (In High Definition)" - 3:37
"All For A Tuesday" - 4:16
"Logistical Nightmare" - 3:52
"Interlude" - 0:13
"December 2 Chapter VII" - 4:51
"The Afterhours" - 4:35
"Stereolove" - 4:48
"Neon Brights" - 3:28
"Shapeshifter" - 8:33

References

2008 albums
Taken by Cars albums